In 2008, the surname "", pinyin Yán, or Yim in Cantonese was estimated to be the 92nd most common surname in the People's Republic of China, shared by around 2.2 million citizens. It is the 27th name on the Hundred Family Surnames poem.
This surname has various origins.  In the state of Chu, the branch of Xiong (熊) of the Zhuang surname (莊) was renamed to Yan (嚴).  The Zhuang (莊) family changed their names to Yan upon the ascension of the Han Ming Emperor, whose personal name was Zhuang, owing to the naming taboo.

In the state of Qin, many families with the surname Ying (嬴) were renamed Yan (嚴).

Citizens of the State of Yan (嚴國) in Ancient China were surnamed Yan (嚴).

During the Sixteen Kingdoms, the royal family of Xianbei were given the surname Yan (嚴).

Some ethnic minority groups in China, including the Xibe people, Yi people and Tu people, also use the surname Yan (嚴)

Origins
People with the surname Zhuang (莊) changed it to 嚴 (both meaning ‘solemnity’) during the reign of Emperor Ming of Han, who person name was Liu Zhuang (劉莊), due to a naming taboo as the surname 莊 happened to be the given name of the emperor. Later some descendants kept the surname, whereas others changed back to the original.

Notable people
 Yen Ming, Minister of National Defense of the Republic of China (2013–2015)
 Yen Teh-fa, Minister of National Defense of the Republic of China
 Yen Tzung-ta, Deputy Governor of the Central Bank of the Republic of China
 嚴顔 Yan Yan, a general of the state of Shu Han during the era of the Three Kingdoms
 嚴家麟 Yen Chia-lin, founder of Scouting in China
 嚴家淦 Yen Chia-kan (born 1905–1993), President of Taiwan 1975-1978
 嚴復 Yan Fu (born 1854), Chinese scholar
 嚴歌苓 Geling Yan (born 1958), Chinese-American writer
 嚴浩 Yim Ho (born 1952) Hong Kong film directors, leader of Hong Kong New Wave
 Yan Huilian (born 1983), Chinese archer
 严家其 Yan Jiaqi (born 1942), Chinese political scientist and dissident 
 嚴金萱 Yan Jinxuan (born 1924), Chinese composer of The White Haired Girl
 严隽琪 Yan Junqi (born 1946), Vice chairwoman of the standing committee of the National People's Congress of China
 严培明 Yan Pei-Ming (born 1960), Chinese-born French painter
 严诗敏 Yan Shimin (born 1987), Chinese rower
 严顺开 Yan Shunkai (born 1937), Chinese comedian, actor and director
 嚴倩君 Sophia Yan (born 1986), American classical pianist
 嚴詠春 Yim Wing-chun, a Chinese legendary character, often cited in Wing Chun legends as the first master of the martial art bearing her name
 严屹宽 Yan Yikuan (born 1979), Chinese actor and singer
 嚴爵 Yen-j (born 1988), Taiwanese singer and actor
 严红 Yan Hong (born 1967), Chinese swimmer
 严剑葵 Yan Jiankui (born 1976), Chinese sprinter
 Yan Jing (born 1970), Chinese fencer
 严济慈 Yan Jici (born 1901), Chinese physicist and politician
  严浩翔 Yan Haoxiang (2002), singer, member of Teens in Times

References

Chinese-language surnames